Kimmy Gatewood is an American actress, director, writer and singer.

Gatewood is a native of Silver Spring, Maryland, and was educated at Paint Branch High School. She has been in a long-running comedy duo with fellow GLOW actress Rebekka Johnson.

The Apple Sisters
Gatewood is co-creator of The Apple Sisters, a World War II musical comedy trio. The group, which consists of herself, Rebekka Johnson, and Sarah Lowe, started in 2007 in New York City. They received critical acclaim at the 2008 Montreal Just For Laughs Comedy Festival, and moved the group to Los Angeles where they continue to perform.

Filmography

Film

Television

References

External links

Living people
21st-century American actresses
American film actresses
American television actresses
Cultural depictions of Hillary Clinton
People from Silver Spring, Maryland
Year of birth missing (living people)